Sir William Henry Bradshaw Mack  (21 August 1894 - 9 March 1974) was a British diplomat. He was Ambassador to Austria from 1945 to 1948, Ambassador to Iraq from 1948 to 1951, and Ambassador to Argentina from 1951 to 1955.

References

Ambassadors of the United Kingdom to Austria
Ambassadors of the United Kingdom to Iraq
Ambassadors of the United Kingdom to Argentina
Knights Commander of the Order of St Michael and St George
Knights Grand Cross of the Order of the British Empire
1894 births
1974 deaths